The mouselike pipistrelle (Hypsugo musciculus) is a species of vesper bat in the family Vespertilionidae. It is found in Cameroon, Republic of the Congo, Democratic Republic of the Congo, and Gabon. Its natural habitats are subtropical and tropical dry and moist lowland forests.

It is the only species in the genus Hypsugo known to exist in sub-Saharan Africa; all others have been reclassified into the genera Neoromicia or Nycticeinops. However, its exact taxonomic placement remains uncertain.

References

Hypsugo
Mammals described in 1913
Taxonomy articles created by Polbot
Taxa named by Oldfield Thomas
Bats of Africa